Moapa National Forest was established in Nevada on July 1, 1908 with  from the consolidation of Charleston National Forest and Vegas National Forest. On July 1, 1915 it was absorbed by Toiyabe National Forest and the name was discontinued.

References

External links
Forest History Society
Forest History Society:Listing of the National Forests of the United States Text from Davis, Richard C., ed. Encyclopedia of American Forest and Conservation History. New York: Macmillan Publishing Company for the Forest History Society, 1983. Vol. II, pp. 743-788.

Former National Forests of Nevada
1908 establishments in Nevada
Protected areas established in 1908
1915 disestablishments in Nevada
Protected areas disestablished in 1915
Humboldt–Toiyabe National Forest